Based on a True Story may refer to:

Albums
 Based on a T.R.U. Story, by 2 Chainz, 2012
 Based on a True Story..., by Blake Shelton, 2013
 Based on a True Story (The Del-Lords album), 1988
 Based on a True Story (Fat Freddy's Drop album), 2005
 Based on a True Story (Kimberley Locke album), 2007
 Based on a True Story (Lil' Mo album), 2001
 Based on a True Story (Mack 10 album) or the title song, 1997
 Based on a True Story (Paddy Milner album), 2007
 Based on a True Story (Sick of It All album), 2010
 Based on a True Story (Silkk the Shocker album), 2004
 Based on a True Story (The Starting Line album), 2005
 Based on a True Story (Trick Daddy album) or the title song, 1997
 Based on a True Story, by Øystein Sevåg, 2007
 Based on a True Story (Brynn Cartelli EP), 2021
 Based on a True Story, an EP by Jake Miller, 2019

Film and television
 Based on a True Story (film), a 2017 film directed by Roman Polanski
 Based on a True Story (TV series), an upcoming comedy thriller series
 "Based on a True Story" (Arthur), a television episode

Literature
Based on a True Story, a 2008 short-story collection by Hesh Kestin
Based on a True Story, a 2016 semi-fictional memoir by Norm Macdonald
Based on a True Story, a 2015 novel by Delphine de Vigan

See also
 
 Docudrama
 List of films based on actual events
 Non-fiction novel
 True Story (disambiguation)
 True Stories (disambiguation)